Tony "Demolition Man" Dolan (born 1964) is an English musician, best known as the bassist and vocalist of heavy metal bands Atomkraft and formerly Venom. He currently plays in Venom Inc., alongside fellow former Venom member guitarist Mantas and drummer Jeramie Kling.

Biography

Dolan and Paul Spillett formed Atomkraft in Newcastle upon Tyne in 1979. Dolan was a vocalist from 1979 to 1986, and played guitars from 1979 to 1981 and on to 1988, just before they broke up. From 1981 to 1987, he played bass guitar. When Atomkraft was reformed in 2004, Dolan took up the duty of vocalist and bassist again. In 1988, he was offered a role of bassist and vocalist for the prominent heavy metal band Venom. He recorded four albums with Venom before leaving the band in 1993. Dolan also participated in other acts, including Mantas (solo band by former Venom guitarist Jeffrey "Mantas" Dunn), Dogmatix and Raubtier. In 2010, with Jeffrey Dunn and Anthony Lant, he started playing bass guitar and singing in Mpire of Evil. 

Dolan has also had acting roles and played in films like Master and Commander and Dirty War.

Equipment 
 Aria Pro II Cardinal Series CSB-380
 Aria Pro II SB-1000
 Ibanez Artist bass (red finish, as seen on the Venom Live 90 gig)
 Overwater bass
 M-16 bass
 Infinity Perspex bass
 B.C.Rich Zombie bass clone
 Washburn five-string
 Rickenbacker 4001
 LTD F-414FM
 Brian May guitar

In 2017, Dolan announced an exclusive deal with Dutch guitar builder Bo~EL Guitars. He plays the Bo~EL Big Generator bass guitar.

Discography

With Atomkraft 
 Future Warriors (1985)
 Queen of Death EP (1986)
 Tonpress (1987)
 Conductors of Noize (1987)
 Total Metal: The Neat Anthology (2005)

With Venom 
 Prime Evil (1989)
 Tear Your Soul Apart (EP) (1990)
 Temples of Ice (1991)
 The Waste Lands (1992)

With Mpire of Evil 
 Creatures of the Black (EP, 2011)
 Hell to the Holy (2012)
 Crucified (2013)

With Venom Inc. 
 Avé (2017)
 There's Only Black (2022)

Other projects 
 Dogmatix – Conspiracy (2000) – guitars, bass guitar
 Mantas – Zero Tolerance (2004) – bass guitar
 Superthriller – Zero (2004) – blues guitar solo on "Upgrade"
 Joe Matera – Slave to the Fingers (EP, 2011) – bass guitar
 Joe Matera – Creature of Habit (LP, 2012) – bass guitar
 Eversin – Tears on the Face of God (2012) – vocals on "Nightblaster"
 Virus – Metal 2 the Masses North Wales (2021) – bass guitar at "Metal 2 the Masses North Wales"

Filmography 
 Master and Commander: The Far Side of the World (2003) – Mr. Lamb, Carpenter
 Battlefield Britain (2004) – Royal Musketeer-Prisoner
 Dirty War (2004) – Lead TSG Officer

References

External links 

 Tony Dolan official website
 

English male film actors
English people of Irish descent
Living people
English heavy metal bass guitarists
Male bass guitarists
Musicians from Newcastle upon Tyne
1964 births